Haijian 46 is a China Marine Surveillance (CMS) ship in the 4th Marine Surveillance Flotilla of the East China Sea Fleet. On September 11, 2012, after Japanese Prime Minister Yoshihiko Noda purchased the Diaoyu/Senkaku Islands from its private owners - the Kurihara family for ¥2.05bn, Haijian 46 and Haijian 49 set out to conduct operations in the waters around the disputed islands.

References

Ships of the China Marine Surveillance